Mister Jerico is a 1970 British crime comedy film directed by Sidney Hayers and starring Patrick Macnee. Originally made for TV, it was released theatrically in the U.K. and some other territories. Smooth conman Dudley Jerico plots to relieve millionaire Mr. Rosso of his Gemini diamond.

Cast
Patrick Macnee as Dudley Jerico
Connie Stevens as Susan / Claudine / Georgina
Herbert Lom as Rosso
Marty Allen as Wally
Leonardo Pieroni as Angelo
Peter Yapp as Felipe
Bruce Boa as Nolan
Joanne Dainton as Merle
Paul Darrow as Receptionist
Jasmina Hilton as Maid

Production
It was filmed in London and Malta.

Critical reception
The Radio Times found it a "disappointing comedy caper...despite the catchy title track from Lulu and the star's stunning array of flowery shirts"; whereas Cinedelica wrote "the final minutes are a bit cheesy, but it's still solid entertainment...Certainly one for ITC and Avengers fans - and indeed, anyone who likes a 60s crime caper."

References

External links
Mister Jerico at IMDb
Mister Jerico at BFI
Mister Jerico at Letterbox DVD

1970 television films
British crime comedy films
Films directed by Sidney Hayers
1970s English-language films
1970s British films
British comedy television films